McDowell County is the name of two counties in the United States:

 McDowell County, North Carolina 
 McDowell County, West Virginia